Romeu Zema Neto (born 28 October 1964) is a Brazilian businessman, administrator, and politician affiliated with the NOVO party. The current Governor of the state of Minas Gerais, Zema served as the head of the Zema Group, an industrial conglomerate, from 1990 to 2016. First elected in 2018, he won 42.73% of the valid votes, qualifying for a second round against Antônio Anastasia. Winning with 72.80% of the votes, he was inaugurated in 2019.

In 2022, he won a decisive re-election against sports commentator and mayor of Belo Horizonte, Alexandre Kalil, with 56.18% in the first round. Zema has been touted by some as a possible presidential candidate for the 2026 Brazilian presidential election, given his alliance with Jair Bolsonaro in the 2018 and 2022 Brazilian presidential elections.

Business career 
Zema was born in Araxá, Minas Gerais, to Romeu Zema Neto and Maria Lúcia Zema. His paternal great-grandfather, Domingos Zema, was an immigrant from the Kingdom of the Two Sicilies; Zema lived in considerable wealth due to the Zema Group, a conglomerate set up by Domingos. He worked as a gas station attendant, clerk, stock clerk, cashier, buyer, seller, marketing analyst, commercial analyst and manager at various points in his life. After 26 years at the head of the company, Zema stepped down in 2016. Zema has a degree from the Getúlio Vargas Foundation in business administration.

2018 election

First round 

Zema was a member of the Liberal Party for all of his political affiliation but changed to run for NOVO in the 2018 Minas Gerais gubernatorial election. He polled low, given NOVO's relatively low profile, initially with 3%, tying with the REDE candidate. His main opponents in PSDB and incumbent governor Fernando Pimentel, of the Worker's Party, held 10 point leads. However, Zema began to gain traction.

In the closing remarks of the Globo debate, Romeu Zema stated that "those who want change, of course, can vote for the different candidates, which are Amoêdo and Bolsonaro." NOVO's national directory saw this statement as partisan infidelity on the part of Zema, because of his defense of the Bolsonaro campaign. However, the state directorate put this as a misunderstanding, highlighting the party's inexperience in matters of political relevance, such as large-scale debates. Some analysts attributed Romeu Zema's unexpected success in the first round to this statement. Romeu Zema officially declared support for Jair Bolsonaro during the campaign in the second round, a factor that led him to suffer criticism from the population, being booed and called an "opportunist" when participating in a campaign act in favor of Bolsonaro. On 7 October 2018, the first round of the general elections was held in Brazil, and Romeu Zema reached the mark of 42.73% of valid votes against 29.06% for Antônio Anastasia and 23.12% for Fernando Pimentel.

Second round 

In the second round of the elections, Zema received the support of João Batista dos Mares Guia (REDE). PSL, the party of presidential candidate Jair Bolsonaro, decided not to support the candidacy of Romeu Zema in Minas Gerais. After being asked about accepting support from governor Fernando Pimentel, Zema initially stated that he would not refuse the defeated governor's support as long as he did not ask for secretariats in return. On social media, Antônio Anastasia criticized Zema's position stating that "he wanted PT on his side", even though the Workers' Party candidate was not part of the second round of the election. On social media, Zema said that Anatasia's video was "fake news" and that he would not make a deal with PT. Later, Pimentel and his party declared neutrality in the second round.

Zema was elected in the second round of the 2018 elections as the 39th Governor of Minas Gerais, being driven by the search for renewal in politics and the anti-PT movement, mixed with Bolsonaro's growth in the 2018 elections. Some analysts pointed out that Zema's victory in the elections was the result of a polarized political attrition between PT and PSDB, responsible for the state for the last 16 years. In this sense, Zema would have taken advantage of the wave of renewal and the population's will to change in the face of the economic crises of the period.

First term

Inauguration 

Zema was inaugurated on 19 December 2018, along with vice governor Paulo Brant (elected for NOVO and later changed to PSDB), an engineering professor, in the Palácio das Artes in Belo Horizonte. The ceremony also installed two senators elected in the same elections, Carlos Viana (elected for PHS and later changed to PL) and Alexandre Silveira (PSD), and the 77 state deputies elected in the same election. Zema did not attend Jair Bolsonaro's inauguration, even though he had various forms of transportation at his disposal, largely bough in his predecessor term. Zema had heavily campaigned against what he deemed "frivilous government spending" like the transportation in the election.

Government spending 
Zema had campaigned on cutting government spending and returning taxes to voters. He struggled however, because his party only had 5 state deputies.

Secretariat overhaul 
After taking office, Zema sought to approve the new organization of the Minas Gerais' secretariat that would reduce the number of secretariats from 21 to 12 and eliminate 3,600 commissioned positions, stating that he would save 1 billion reais during his 4 years in government. After 4 months of negotiations, in May, the reform was approved by the Legislative Assembly of Minas Gerais, but Zema vetoed the ban on "jetons", something that increased the salaries of state secretaries that he had criticized in the electoral campaign; defending his change of opinion, Zema argued that "after verifying the effective reality of the state, he attested to its usefulness".

Civil servant spending 
In 2020, due to pressure from the Military Police of Minas Gerais, Zema sent a bill that gave a 41% salary readjustment for public security servants in 3 years, but PT's parliamentary bench was successful in expanding the readjustment for all employees, something that would significantly increase the state's public deficit. After approval by the assembly, Zema almost entirely vetoed the text, maintaining the 13% readjustment only for public security servants. Zema suffered harsh criticism for his performance, with the media commenting that it would be the "biggest political crisis of the government", the national NOVO recommending the complete veto of the project, the government secretary Olavo Bilac Pinto Neto asked for his resignation due to considering the government's articulation unfeasible, and vice governor Paulo Brant announcing his switch from NOVO to PSDB for considering that the party had "chosen to remain on the sidelines of coalitions" rather than its ideals.

Pension reform 

Still in 2020, even after the crises left by the readjustment of public security servants' salary and in the face of the COVID-19 pandemic, the Zema government had the goal of approving the reform of the state pension, with the aim of improving, in the long term, the situation of public accounts in Minas Gerais; the state has one of the worst fiscal deficits in the country. For this, Zema made some changes in his political allies, passing Igor Eto, who was the Secretary-General to the Secretary of Government, and bringing Mateus Simões to the Secretary-General of the State, who was until then City Councilor of Belo Horizonte. Both Mateus Simões and Igor Eto are members of NOVO. Governor Zema also brought in a new government leader, state deputy Raul Belém (PSC). Despite the original proposal sent by the government having been modified by the Legislative Assembly, the Zema government was successful in passing the pension reform with a minimum age of 65 for men and 62 for women.

COVID-19 

After the advent of the COVID-19 pandemic, Zema issued lockdown orders that were criticised by NOVO's national directory, who claimed that the measures "negatively affected business".

In later 2020, the underreporting of COVID cases in Minas Gerais was criticized by the press. Zema stated that tests for COVID-19 were "just to satisfy the curiosity of researchers, while not assisting in puplic health". Despite the presence of underreporting, this was a trend throughout Brazil due to an increase in cases of Acute Respiratory Syndrome (SARS). In September 2020, Minas Gerais was considered the state with the lowest rate of deaths per inhabitant in Brazil.

In 2021 it was reported that Zema's government was under investigation by Augusto Aras, the Attorney General of Brazil, for its handling of state PPE purchases that may have benefited certain companies rather than achieving the lowest price. Zema denied any wrongdoing.

Response to the Brumadinho dam disaster 

On 25 January 2019, a dam operated by Vale S.A. in the municipality of Brumadinho collapsed, killing at least 259 people.

In 2021, the Zema government closed an agreement with Vale S.A. for the damage caused by the dam's rupture, in which the company will pay the State 37.68 billion reais; the money was set to be used in infrastructure works for the affected region. The Movement of People Affected by Dams organized a protest against the agreement, which the group considered unfair, while other actors welcomed the speed of the process.

2022 election

Campaign

Platform 
Before the election, Zema Released the following platform.
 
 Construction and operation of regional hospitals through concession and public-private partnerships
 Expansion of the free offer of technical and integral education courses
 Reform of state schools, with the acquisition of equipment and furniture
 Integration actions between the police and integration of public security information bases
 Expansion of the digital duty to ensure full-time police assistance
 Expansion of concession programs and public-private partnerships, including for the operation of highways, airports and metropolitan transport, and privatization of state-owned companies
 Creation of a state fund for the granting of credits to family farmers
 Incentives for clean energy and the use of non-fossil fuels
 Expansion of the concessions program for managing parks and conservation units
 Providing vocational education courses for youth and adults in poverty
 Granting of credit, paid for by the state, to cover urgent housing demands

Victory 
Zema retained high levels of popularity throughout his first term, never dipping below 40% while much of the population. This led to a tough challenge that his two main opponents Alexandre Kalil and Carlos Viana failed to meet.

Zema only attended some of the debates and pointed to differing forms of misinformation in his campaign while maintaining a form of neutrality in the first round of the presidential elections, barely interacting with his party's nominee Felipe D'Avila, given one of his opponents was from Bolsonaro's party.

Kalil's alliance with the PT, did little to sway Lulazema voters, who split their ballots between the right and left.

Zema was reelected in the first round, avoiding a distracting second round, but failed to achieve the landslide he had achieved in 2018, winning 56.18% of the vote, for the first time forming a coalition for his reelction.

Support for Bolsonaro 
While Zema officially supported Felipe D'Avila, his party's nominee in the first round, he made no secret his support for Bolsonaro in the second, endorsing him just days after the first vote.

While he promised to corral support, along with Claudio Castro, he seemed to be making lackluster efforts, more trying to build a national profile in 2026. While he got some mayors, he has already begun distancing himself according to some, who think that Zema expects Bolsonaro to lose.

Controversies

Comments on domestic violence 
On March 9, 2020, during the launch of a state government programme to support victims of domestic violence, Zema referred to domestic violence as “a natural instinct of human beings.”

Alleged government impropriety 

As part of its lawsuit calling for the invalidation of Zema’s candidacy, the far-right Brazilian Woman’s Party accused Zema of using the government secretariat to invite the party to join his electoral coalition.

Charles Soares de Sousa, the Zema-appointed superintendent of the Minas Gerais Supram, intervened to cancel a fine against Gute Schit, a mining company linked to a consulting firm Sousa had provided services for.

Personal life 
Zema was married to Ivana Scarpellini and had two children, Catharina and Domenico. They are divorced.

Romeu Zema also has Italian citizenship, however, in 2019, his Italian passport was revoked amid an investigation that revealed fraud in the issuance of documents by several Brazilians. Finally, the citizenship, having been finalized and reapproved, was granted, amid critisicms of dual loyalties.

Elections

References

1964 births
Living people
Brazilian people of Italian descent
Governors of Minas Gerais
New Party (Brazil) politicians
Liberal Party (Brazil, 2006) politicians
Fundação Getulio Vargas alumni